Karl Jestrab (12 January 1907 – 14 February 1980) was an Austrian footballer. He played in one match for the Austria national football team in 1935.

References

External links
 

1907 births
1980 deaths
Austrian footballers
Austria international footballers
Place of birth missing
Association footballers not categorized by position